Caribou Lou may refer to:

"Caribou Lou", a song by Tech N9ne from his 2006 album Everready (The Religion)
Caribou Lou, a cocktail made with 151 proof rum, pineapple juice, and Malibu rum